At least four ships of the French Navy have borne the name Requin:

 , a cutter captured by the Royal Navy in 1795
 , a musket-armed ship operating out of Dieppe during the French Revolution, captured by HM-Cutter Lion
 , a  launched in 1885 and stricken in 1920
 , a  launched in 1924 and sold for scrap in 1944
 , a Narval-class submarine completed in 1958 and stricken in 1985

See also
  of the French Navy
 Requin (disambiguation)

French Navy ship names